The European Journal of Physiotherapy is a quarterly peer-reviewed medical journal covering physiotherapy. It was established in 1999 as Advances in Physiotherapy, obtaining its current name in 2013. It is published by Taylor & Francis and the editor in chief is Gunnevi Sundelin (Umeå University).

Abstracting and indexing
The journal is abstracted and indexed in CINAHL, Excerpta Medica/Embase, and Scopus.

References

External links

Publications established in 1999
Physical therapy journals
Quarterly journals
Taylor & Francis academic journals
English-language journals